James M. Martin Sr. (December 14, 1938 – May 31, 2019) was an American politician who served as a Republican member of the Alabama House of Representatives from the 42nd district from 2014 until his death from cancer in 2019. He previously served as a Democrat from 1998 to 2010.

References

Democratic Party members of the Alabama House of Representatives
Republican Party members of the Alabama House of Representatives
American funeral directors
1938 births
2019 deaths
People from Montgomery County, Alabama
21st-century American politicians